was a Japanese long-distance runner. He competed in the marathon at the 1960 Summer Olympics.

References

1929 births
2003 deaths
Sportspeople from Yamaguchi Prefecture
Japanese male long-distance runners
Japanese male marathon runners
Olympic male marathon runners
Olympic athletes of Japan
Athletes (track and field) at the 1960 Summer Olympics
Asian Games bronze medalists for Japan
Asian Games medalists in athletics (track and field)
Athletes (track and field) at the 1958 Asian Games
Medalists at the 1958 Asian Games
Japan Championships in Athletics winners
20th-century Japanese people
21st-century Japanese people